James Weller Ladbroke (1772 at Idlicote, Warwickshire – 23 March 1847 at Petworth, Sussex) was an English cricketer who played first-class cricket from 1800 to 1826.  He had amateur status and was mainly associated with Sussex but played for several occasional teams too, making 19 known appearances in matches designated first-class by CricketArchive. He totalled 73 runs with a highest score of 12, held one catch and took one wicket. Until 1819 when he changed his name following an inheritance, Ladbroke was called James Weller. He was a captain in the British Army.

References

External links

Bibliography
 Arthur Haygarth, Scores & Biographies, Volume 1 (1744–1826), Lillywhite, 1862

1772 births
1847 deaths
English cricketers
English cricketers of 1787 to 1825
Sussex cricketers
Surrey cricketers
Non-international England cricketers
Godalming Cricket Club cricketers
Marylebone Cricket Club cricketers